Gheorghe Bădescu (born 6 September 1937) is a Romanian cross-country skier. He competed in the men's 15 kilometre event at the 1964 Winter Olympics.

References

1937 births
Living people
Romanian male cross-country skiers
Olympic cross-country skiers of Romania
Cross-country skiers at the 1964 Winter Olympics
People from Brașov County